Scopula paradelpharia is a moth of the  family Geometridae. It is found in Ivory Coast, Kenya and Senegal.

References

Moths described in 1920
paradelpharia
Insects of West Africa
Moths of Africa